In statistical hypothesis testing, a turning point test is a statistical test of the independence of a series of random variables. Maurice Kendall and Alan Stuart describe the test as "reasonable for a test against cyclicity but poor as a test against trend." The test was first published by Irénée-Jules Bienaymé in 1874.

Statement of test

The turning point tests the null hypothesis

H0: X1, X2, ..., Xn are independent and identically distributed random variables (iid)

against

H1: X1, X2, ..., Xn are not iid.

Test statistic

We say i is a turning point if the vector X1, X2, ..., Xi, ..., Xn is not monotonic at index i. The number of turning points is the number of maxima and minima in the series.

Letting T be the number of turning points then for large n, T is approximately normally distributed with mean (2n − 4)/3 and variance (16n − 29)/90. The test statistic

is approximately standard normal for large values of n.

Applications

The test can be used to verify the accuracy of a fitted time series model such as that describing irrigation requirements.

References

Time series statistical tests